Damir Memović (born 19 January 1989), is a Serbian professional footballer who plays as a defender. He is currently a free agent, and last played for V.League club Hoàng Anh Gia Lai.

Career

Club
On 31 July 2015, Memović was presented as a new signing for Gandzasar Kapan in the Armenian Premier League.

After signing with Zvijezda 09 in September 2018, he left the club again at the end of the year, where his contract expired.

In 2019, he moved to Vietnam to play for Song Lam Nghe An and later joined Hoang Anh Gia Lai FC.

Career statistics

Club

Honours 
Gandzasar Kapan
 Armenian Cup: 2017–18

References 

1989 births
Living people
Serbian footballers
Serbian expatriate footballers
Expatriate footballers in Armenia
Serbian expatriate sportspeople in Armenia
FK Hajduk Beograd players
FK Sinđelić Beograd players
FK Dolina Padina players
FK Drina Zvornik players
FC Gandzasar Kapan players
Song Lam Nghe An FC players
Serbian expatriate sportspeople in Vietnam
Premier League of Bosnia and Herzegovina players
Armenian Premier League players
V.League 1 players
Association football defenders